The 2004–05 season was the 103rd season in the history of Norwich City. It was the club's first season in the Premier League for nine years, following promotion from the First Division in 2003–04. However, they were immediately relegated back to the second tier, notably without having won a competitive match away from home during the whole season. Despite being in pole position to stay up going into the final match of the season against Fulham, a 6–0 defeat at Craven Cottage sealed their fate. This article shows statistics and lists all matches played by the club during the season.

Statistics

Appearances, goals and cards
(Substitute appearances in brackets)

Matches

League

August

September

October

November

December

January

February

March

April

May

FA Cup

League Cup

First team squad

Out on loan

Left club during season

Transfers

In
 Youssef Safri – Coventry City, 25 June, £500,000
 Simon Charlton – Bolton Wanderers, 13 July, £250,000
 Thomas Helveg – Inter Milan, 22 July, free
 Mattias Jonson – Brøndby, 5 August, undisclosed
 Darren Ward – Nottingham Forest, 6 August, undisclosed  
 Gary Doherty – Tottenham Hotspur, 20 August, £1,000,000
 Dean Ashton – Crewe Alexandra, 10 January, £4,450,000
 Graham Stuart – Charlton Athletic, 31 January, undisclosed
 David Bentley – Arsenal, season-long loan

Out
 Malky Mackay – West Ham United, 10 September, £300,000
 Keith Briggs – released, 25 September (later joined Stockport County)
 Zema Abbey – released, 26 September (later joined Wycombe Wanderers on 7 October)
 Iwan Roberts – released, May (later joined Gillingham on 28 June
 Lee Blackburn – Cambridge United
 Mark Rivers – released, July (later joined Crewe Alexandra on 20 July)

Loan out
 Danny Crow – Northampton Town, 15 February, three months
 Paul Gallacher – Sheffield Wednesday

Final league table

Notes

References

Norwich City F.C. seasons
Norwich City